Abel Tarride (1865–1951) was a French actor. He was the father of the actor Jacques Tarride and the director Jean Tarride. He played the role of Jules Maigret in the 1932 film The Yellow Dog, directed by his son.

Selected filmography
 Jocaste (1925)
 The Yellow Dog (1932)
 Kiss Me (1932)
 A Love Story (1933)
 Aux portes de Paris (1934)
 L'Aventurier (1934)
 The Queen and the Cardinal (1935)
 Nitchevo (1936)
 The Two Girls (1936)
 The Silent Battle (1937)
 The Green Jacket (1937)
 Entente cordiale (1939)
 Night Warning (1946)

External links

1865 births
1951 deaths
French male stage actors
French male film actors
French male silent film actors
People from Niort
20th-century French male actors